Actinostachys is a genus of small ferns originally included in the genus Schizaea. The genus was segregated on the basis of the flabelliform (fan-shaped) laminae.  The genus is colloquially called the ray ferns.

Species
, World Ferns accepted the following species:

Phylogeny of Actinostachys

Other species include:
Actinostachys balansae (Fourn.) C.F. Reed
Actinostachys inopinata (Selling) C.F. Reed
Actinostachys intermedia (Mett.) C.F. Reed
Actinostachys macrofunda Bierh.
Actinostachys minuta Amoroso & Coritico
Actinostachys oligostachys Bierh.
Actinostachys plana (Fourn.) C.F. Reed
Actinostachys simplex Amoroso & Coritico
Actinostachys spirophylla (W. Troll) C.F. Reed
Actinostachys tenuis (Fourn.) C.F. Reed

References

World species list of Actinostachys: https://web.archive.org/web/20090908034926/http://homepages.caverock.net.nz/~bj/fern/actinostachys.htm

Schizaeales
Fern genera